Publius Claudius Pulcher may refer to:
 Publius Claudius Pulcher (consul 249 BC), Roman senator
 Publius Claudius Pulcher (consul 184 BC), Roman senator
 Publius Claudius Pulcher (son of Clodius), Roman senator
 Publius Clodius Pulcher, Roman senator and street agitator

See also 

 
 Claudius Pulcher (disambiguation)